Lawrence Olimb is an American retired ice hockey defenseman and center who was an All-American for Minnesota.

Career
Olimb was a star player in high school, helping Warroad High School reach the state tournament twice. Because he turned 18 before the start of his senior season, Olimb was eligible for the 1987 NHL Entry Draft and became one of the few high school players to have already been drafted after the Minnesota North Stars selected him in the 10th round. He continued to show his talent that season and received the Mr. Hockey Award as the top player in the state. He would later be ranked as the 33rd best player in the history of Minnesota High School Hockey.

With his highly successful junior career, there was little surprise that Olimb ended up going to Minnesota. In his freshman season, Olimb moved to center and helped the Gophers reach the 1989 championship game. He assisted on the game's opening goal but couldn't prevent Harvard from winning the title in overtime. He remained a key contributor for Minnesota for the next three years, helping the Golden Gophers reach the NCAA Tournament every year he was with the program. Olimb was named team captain for his senior season and responded with his best performance. He scored nearly two points per game and became the Gophers' all-time leader in assists, surpassing the legendary John Mayasich.

After graduating, Olimb played professionally for a few seasons, including a stint in Roller Hockey International, retiring from the game in 1995.

Statistics

Regular season and playoffs

Awards and honors

References

External links

1969 births
Living people
AHCA Division I men's ice hockey All-Americans
American men's ice hockey defensemen
American men's ice hockey centers
Ice hockey players from Minnesota
People from Warroad, Minnesota
Minnesota Golden Gophers men's ice hockey players
Kansas City Blades players
Toledo Storm players
Minnesota Moose players
Minnesota Arctic Blast players
Minnesota North Stars draft picks
Warroad Lakers players